Bukit Besi is a small town in Terengganu, Malaysia.

Populated places in Terengganu